2022 in television may refer to
 2022 in American television for television related events in the United States.
 List of 2022 American television debuts for television debut related events in the United States.
 2022 in Australian television for television related events in Australia.
 2022 in British television for television related events in Great Britain.
 2022 in Scottish television for television related events in Scotland.
 2022 in Canadian television for television related events in Canada.
 2022 in Irish television for television related events in Ireland.
 2022 in Japanese television for television related events in Japan.
 2022 in Pakistani television for television related events in Pakistan.
 2022 in Philippine television for television related events in the Philippines.
 2022 in South Korean television for television related events in South Korea.

2022 in television
Mass media timelines by year